A Perfect State was a 1997 British situation comedy starring Gwen Taylor, Richard Hope, Trevor Cooper, Emma Amos and Danny Webb. It debuted on BBC1 on Thursday 27 February 1997 and ran for seven episodes.

Taylor took the leading role of Laura Fitzgerald, the Deputy Mayor of Flatby, a town on the East Coast of England. As the series begins, she is informed that because Flatby was never surveyed for the Domesday Book, it has never officially been annexed into the United Kingdom. As a result, and much to the chagrin of the Government in London, Laura rallies the townsfolk to declare Flatby an independent state.

Most of the filming was carried out in Wivenhoe in Essex.

External links 
 

BBC television sitcoms
1997 British television series debuts
1997 British television series endings
1990s British sitcoms
1990s British political television series